Timothy John McIntire (July 19, 1944 – April 15, 1986) was an American character actor, probably best known for his starring roles as Alan Freed in the film American Hot Wax (1978), as singer George Jones in the television movie Stand by Your Man (1981), The Gumball Rally (1976) and Brubaker (1980).

Career
McIntire co-starred as Dickie, the son-in-law in the 1968 pilot Justice for All, which eventually (1971) was picked up as the series All In The Family, with Rob Reiner as the son-in-law.

McIntire's film roles include appearances in Shenandoah (1965), The Thousand Plane Raid (1969), The Sterile Cuckoo (1969), Aloha, Bobby and Rose (1975), The Gumball Rally (1976), The Choirboys (1977), Brubaker (1980), Fast-Walking (1982) and Sacred Ground (1983).

McIntire appeared in the 1965 episode "The Lawless Have Laws" as Lorenz Oatman in the television series Death Valley Days. He also appeared in six episodes of Kung Fu, four of them as the long-lost brother of Kwai Chang Caine. Other television roles include appearances in the western The Legend of Jesse James, the 1966 episode "Gauntlet of Fire" of the series 12 O'Clock High and the 1976 miniseries Rich Man, Poor Man and Rich Man, Poor Man Book II.

McIntire composed music for the soundtracks of films, including Jeremiah Johnson (1972) and A Boy and His Dog (1975), for which he provided the voice of the dog, played by Tiger. He provided the devil's voice for the demon baby on Soap (1979). He performed many voice-overs for television and radio commercials.

McIntire, along with six studio musicians, formed the band Funzone, which released one self-titled album in 1977. McIntire is credited with lead vocal, guitar, and fiddle on the album. When the record label behind the band collapsed, so did the band, and McIntire focused his musical energies on soundtracks.

McIntire was the son of actors John McIntire of the television westerns Wagon Train and The Virginian and Jeanette Nolan, who made more than 300 television appearances and was nominated for four Emmy Awards. His younger sister was the actress and photographer Holly Wright. McIntire appeared four times with both his parents on television, first on the 1966 episode "Ill Wind" of the series The Fugitive, then the 1968 episode "Old Charlie" of the series Bonanza, followed by the 1968 episodes "Death Wagon" and "Nora" of The Virginian.

He appeared with his father in the 1966 episode "The Cave-In" of the series The F.B.I.. 

McIntire died at the age of 41 on April 15, 1986 from congestive heart failure in Los Angeles. He is buried at Tobacco Valley Cemetery in Eureka, Montana.

Filmography

References

External links

American male film actors
American male television actors
Musicians from Los Angeles
1944 births
1986 deaths
American people of Irish descent
Male actors from Los Angeles
20th-century American male actors
20th-century American musicians
Burials in Montana